Uniontown Academy is a historic school located at Uniontown, Carroll County, Maryland, United States. It is a one-story building of brick with a stone foundation constructed in 1851 and is said to be a replica of the earlier, 1810 structure. It is three bays wide and three bays long, with a gable roof.  The front facade features a "false" front effect with its corbeled or stepped setbacks derived from a traditional Dutch style often seen in the false store fronts of western towns. The property retains many of its outbuildings and is operated as an inn and restaurant.

The Uniontown Academy was listed on the National Register of Historic Places in 1973.

References

External links
, including photo in 2006, at Maryland Historical Trust

Defunct schools in Maryland
School buildings on the National Register of Historic Places in Maryland
Buildings and structures in Carroll County, Maryland
School buildings completed in 1851
Uniontown, Maryland
1851 establishments in Maryland
National Register of Historic Places in Carroll County, Maryland